The Parascender Para-Ag is an American powered parachute agricultural aircraft that was designed and produced by Parascender Technologies of Kissimmee, Florida. Now out of production, when it was available the aircraft was supplied as a kit for amateur construction.

Design and development
A variant of the Parascender I, the Para-Ag was designed to comply with the US Experimental - Amateur-built aircraft rules. It features a  parachute-style wing, single-place accommodation, tricycle landing gear and a single  Rotax 503 engine in pusher configuration. A  wing was optional.

The aircraft carriage is built from bolted aluminium tubing. Inflight steering is accomplished via foot pedals that actuate the canopy brakes, creating roll and yaw. On the ground the aircraft has foot-controlled nosewheel steering. The main landing gear incorporates spring rod suspension.

The manufacturer estimated the construction time from the supplied kit as 30 hours.

Operational history
In April 2015 no examples were registered in the United States with the Federal Aviation Administration.

Specifications (Para-Ag)

References

External links
Photo of a Para-Ag

Para-Ag
1990s United States sport aircraft
1990s United States ultralight aircraft
Single-engined pusher aircraft
Powered parachutes